Qalandia Camp is a Palestinian refugee camp established in 1949 by the Red Cross on land leased from Jordan. Israeli authorities consider it part of Greater Jerusalem, and it remains under their control.

References 

Populated places established in 1949
Palestinian refugee camps in the West Bank
Jerusalem Governorate